Sir Stephen James McAdden  (3 November 1907 – 27 December 1979) was a British Conservative politician.

McAdden was educated at the Salesian School, Battersea and worked as an export sales manager and company director. He was a councillor on Hackney Borough Council 1935–45, Woodford Borough Council 1945-48 and Essex County Council 1947–48.

McAdden was elected Member of Parliament for Southend East in 1950, and remained in office until he died at a hospital in London on 27 December 1979, aged 72, after falling down a flight of stairs at Westminster tube station on 21 December. His successor at the resulting by-election in March 1980 was Teddy Taylor, who had lost his seat at the previous year's general election.

References

Sources
Times Guide to the House of Commons, 1950, 1966, 1979 and 1983 editions

1907 births
1979 deaths
Accidental deaths in England
Accidental deaths from falls
Conservative Party (UK) MPs for English constituencies
Councillors in Greater London
UK MPs 1950–1951
UK MPs 1951–1955
UK MPs 1955–1959
UK MPs 1959–1964
UK MPs 1964–1966
UK MPs 1966–1970
UK MPs 1970–1974
UK MPs 1974
UK MPs 1974–1979
UK MPs 1979–1983